Jelme (Zelme, ;  1160 – 1207) was a general and close companion of Genghis Khan. He was the older brother of Subutai and was of the Uriankhan clan. Jelme was appointed as leader of a Mingghan, or one thousand men.

Biography
In The Secret History of the Mongols, Jelme is chronicled as having been given to Temujin when the latter was an infant, but was deemed too young, and sent back to his father. Jelme's father Jarchiudai again gives his son to Temujin when Temujin was meeting with the Wang Khan. The reason for Jelme's having been given to Genghis is unclear.

When Temujin is wounded by an arrow to the neck by his future general Jebe, Jelme saves his life by sucking the poisoned blood out. He further brings Temujin watered yoghurt (after failing to find milk) from the enemy's camp.

Jelme's worth to Genghis is exemplified by one of Genghis's proclamations, where Jelme is granted immunity from prosecution even if he commits nine crimes.

References
The Secret History of the Mongols, translated into modern Mongolian by Tsendiin Damdinsuren

Generals of the Mongol Empire
Year of death unknown
Year of birth unknown